The 2013 Australian GT Championship was a CAMS sanctioned national motor racing championship open to GT style closed production based sports cars which were either approved by the FIA for GT3 competition or approved by CAMS as Australian GTs. It was the 17th Australian GT Championship, the twelfth to be contested over a multi-event championship, and the eighth to be contested since the title was revived in 2005. The championship was won by Klark Quinn, driving a Porsche 911 GT3-R Type 997.

Race calendar
The championship was contested over a six round series.

The results for each round of the Championship were determined by the number of points scored by each driver within their division at that round.

During each race in Rounds 2, 3, 4 and 5 of the Championship, each automobile was required to complete one compulsory pit stop during a prescribed pit stop window. During the compulsory pit stop, each automobile was required to remain stationary for a prescribed minimum time plus any additional time required dependent on Driver Classification (i.e. Pro, Master or Gold).

Round 1 at Mount Panorama was contested over the first 50 minutes of the 2013 Liqui Moly Bathurst 12 Hour race. With no compulsory pit stop at the event, time was added to the race time of each automobile, equivalent to double the time prescribed for the Driver Classification of the driver that started the race.

Divisions
Drivers' titles were awarded in four divisions.
 GT Championship – for FIA GT3 specification vehicles
 GT Trophy – for older specification FIA GT3 vehicles
 GT Challenge – for cars that no longer fit within the GT Championship and GT Trophy divisions
 GT Sports – for GT4 specification cars

Points system
Championship points were awarded to each eligible Driver, based on their qualifying position at each round of the Championship and on their finishing position in each race of the Championship, relative to the other Drivers within their division, in accordance with the following table.

Each Competitor who had registered for the entire series could nominate one Round for each automobile, selected from Rounds 2, 3, 4 or 5 only, where double points would be awarded to each Driver entered in that automobile for that Round.

Championship results

GT Championship

GT Championship results

GT Trophy
GT Trophy results

GT Challenge
GT Challenge results

GT Sports

GT Sports results

Footnotes

References

External links

Australian GT Championship
GT